Henri Tézenas du Montcel (January 8, 1943, Blois–December 2, 1994) was a French economist.

References 

1943 births
1994 deaths
Deaths from cancer in France
20th-century  French economists
People from Blois